The International Symposium on Fluorine Chemistry (ISFC) is an academic conference where researchers present their most recent original results on the chemistry of fluorine and its derivatives. Communications deal with all compounds of fluorine, from hydrogen fluoride to fluoropolymers and other fluorocarbons. Participants to editions from 18th ISFC onwards have been nearly 500, most of them were from academia, researchers from fluorochemical industry being the second largest group.

History 
On 14 – 17 July 1959, Colin J. Tatlow organized in Birmingham (UK) an event which was "a milestone in fluorine chemistry", namely he arranged “an International Symposium on Fluorine Chemistry, which became the first of the now regular and important familiar series”. After the 8th ISFC, held in Kyoto (Japan) on 22 – 27 August 1976, ISFCs were systematically organized every three years under the governance of an International Steering Committee. From the very beginning ISFCs were reference events for scientists involved in fluorine chemistry and they played a major role in framing and maintaining the community of fluorine chemists. Some emblematic confirmations of this roles are: results presented at the 1st ISFC (Birmingham, 1959) are cited in a Houben-Weyl volume on fluorine chemistry published in 1999,  results presented at the 4th ISFC (Estes Park, 1967) are mentioned in a book on the chemistry and technology of lubricants published in 2013,  the Moissan Prize  is the most prestigious prize in fluorine chemistry and is presented at ISFCs.

George A. Olah, Nobel Prize in chemistry in 1994, gave a plenary lecture at the 15th ISFC (Vancouver, 1997).  
The Book of Abstracts of 13th ISFC has been published as a special issue of the Journal of Fluorine Chemistry. The Book of Abstract of 21st ISFC can be tracked by its ISBN.

List of Symposia

References

Fluorine
Chemistry conferences
Academic conferences